Yecla is a town and municipality in eastern Spain, in the extreme north of the autonomous community of Murcia, located  96 km from the capital of the region, Murcia.

Toponymy
The origin of the term Yecla comes from the Arabic Yakka, which was the name of a fortress located in the place that is now called Cerro del Castillo. This toponym, however, is not from Arabic origin and it is very likely that it derives from the pre-Roman terms Iko or Ika.

The most important mountains of the locality are Sierra de Salinas (1,238 m), Monte Arabí (1,065 m), Sierra de la Magdalena (1,038 m), and others. The chief buildings are a half-ruined citadel, a modern parish church with a pillared Corinthian facade, and a town hall standing in a fine arcaded plaza mayor (square). Yecla has traditionally had a thriving trade in grain,  wine, oil, fruit and other agricultural products produced in the surrounding country. Since the second half of the 20th century, furniture making has become a local trade.

Monuments
 Mayor Square: monumental gathering renascentist and baroque on the heart of historical center. In the square, followed by ayuntamiento building 16th century, there are also located the Alarcos Palace, the Lonja and the clock tower.
 Concha Segura Theatre: In 1890 the architect Justo Millán Espinosa, improved the theatre front and, in 1899, the theatre, received the name of “Concha Segura” as tribute.
 Castle: Remains of fortified square of the old andalusí population of HisnYakka (11th century).
 Old Church: Is a civil monument, not religious as there haven’t been any events from 1936, the year when it was ransacked and burned in revolts that took place after the revolutionary rise on the 16th of March of that same year. Until that year it had been called Reitoria do Salvador, before Our Lady of Cathedral of the Immaculate: best known as the “New Church” which is the main temple of the city, built between 1775 and 1868 with neoclassic style. The building base is cross shaped.
 Castle Sanctuary: a temple built in the 19th century by a hermit.

Economy
Yecla, with neighboring Jumilla, is one of the primary regions for development of the Murciana and Granadina breeds of dairy goats.

Since the mid-19th century Yecla was consolidated as an agricultural municipality, in particular with the wine production. The main cultures in the region are vines, olive trees, almonds and cereals. In the mid-19th century a new sector rose with the expansion of Yecla. The wood craftsmen have fostered the furniture industry and today Yecla is known by its great furniture production.

Yecla is also a wine-producing region, another attribute it shares with close-by Jumilla

Politics: Town Councilors
Municipal elections result

PP 12 PSOE 5 IU 2 CS 2

Twin towns
  Vinaròs, Spain
  Eibar, Spain
  El Barco de Ávila, Spain

See also
 Yeclano Deportivo
 Yecla (DO)

References

External links
 Yecla Community web site for expats
 Yecla.org
 The wine region DO Yecla
  Las cazoletas y petroglifos de Yecla, Murcia (Open Library)

Municipalities in the Region of Murcia